Man O' War Bay or Man of War Bay may refer to:
 Man of War Bay, Abaco Islands, Bahamas, a bay on the Abaco Islands, Bahamas
 Man O' War Bay, Cameroon, a bay near Limbe, Cameroon
 Man O' War Bay, Great Tobago, a bay on Great Tobago, British Virgin Islands 
 Man O' War Bay, New Zealand, a beach on Waiheke Island, New Zealand
 Man-o-War Bay, Tobago, a bay at the north-eastern tip of Tobago
 Man of War Bay, a bay on the Dorset coast in southern England

See also
 Man O' War (disambiguation)